is a railway station in the city of Nasukarasuyama, Tochigi, Japan, operated by the East Japan Railway Company (JR East).

Lines

Station layout
The station has two opposed side platforms connected to the station building by a level crossing. The station is unattended.

Platforms

History
The station opened on 15 April 1923.

The station became unstaffed from August 2013, with no facilities available for purchasing tickets.

Surrounding area
former Minaminasu town hall
Ōgane Onsen
Minaminasu Post Office

See also
 List of railway stations in Japan

References

External links

 JR East Station information 

Railway stations in Tochigi Prefecture
Railway stations in Japan opened in 1923
Karasuyama Line
Nasukarasuyama
Stations of East Japan Railway Company